Jungle Love is a Hindi action adventure film of Bollywood based on the Tarzan story. This was directed by V. Menon and produced by Rajkumar Ludhani  The film was released on 12 July 1990 in the banner of Ram Lakhan Production.

Plot
A chimpanzee of the Amazonian jungle saves a baby and raises him as her own. He becomes the Tarzan of the jungle. A gang of treasure hunters come to the jungle with two young ladies accompanying them. One of them, Rita is captured by a cannibalistic tribe. Tarzan saves her and befrnglhiends Rita. Rita gives him a name Raja and falls in love with him.

Cast
 Satish Shah
 Goga Kapoor
 Gajendra Chouhan
 Kirti Singh as Rita
 Rita Bhaduri
 Aruna Irani
 Disco Shanti
 Rocky as Raja
 Mahesh Anand
 Shiva

Soundtrack 
The music of the film is composed by Anand-Milind, and the lead singers are Manhar Udhas, Anuradha Paudwal, Falguni Singh and Sadhana Sargam.

" He Man O My He Man" - Falguni Singh
"Hum To The Anjaane" - Anuradha Paudwal
"Koyaliya Gati Hai Payaliya Chhankati Hai" - Anuradha Paudwal
"Laila Ne Kaha Jo Majnu Se" - Anuradha Paudwal, Manhar Udhas
"Mera Mehboob Aayega" - Sadhana Sargam

References

External links
 Jungle Love on Gomolo

1990 films
1990s action adventure films
1990s Hindi-language films
Indian action adventure films
Tarzan films
Films scored by Anand–Milind